Toxicity class refers to a classification system for pesticides that has been created by a national or international government-related or -sponsored organization. It addresses the acute toxicity of agents such as soil fumigants, fungicides, herbicides, insecticides, miticides, molluscicides, nematicides, or rodenticides.

General considerations 
Assignment to a toxicity class is based typically on results of acute toxicity studies such as the determination of  values in animal experiments, notably rodents, via oral, inhaled, or external application. The experimental design measures the acute death rate of an agent.  The toxicity class generally does not address issues of other potential harm of the agent, such as bioaccumulation, issues of carcinogenicity, teratogenicity, mutagenic effects, or the impact on reproduction.

Regulating agencies may require that packaging of the agent be labeled with a signal word, a specific warning label to indicate the level of toxicity.

By jurisdiction

World Health Organization 
The World Health Organization (WHO) names four toxicity classes:
Class I – a:  extremely hazardous
Class I – b:  highly hazardous
Class II:  moderately hazardous
Class III:  slightly hazardous

The system is based on LD50 determination in rats, thus  an oral solid agent with an LD50 at 5 mg or less/kg bodyweight is Class Ia, at 5–50 mg/kg is Class Ib, LD50 at 50–2000 mg/kg is Class II, and at LD50 at the concentration more than 2000 mg/kg is classified as Class III. Values may differ for liquid oral agents and dermal agents.

European Union 
There are eight toxicity classes in the European Union's classification system, which is regulated by Directive 67/548/EEC: 
Class I: very toxic
Class II: toxic 
Class III: harmful
Class IV : corrosive
Class V : irritant
Class VI : sensitizing
Class VII : carcinogenic
Class VIII : mutagenic
Very toxic and toxic substances are marked by the European toxicity symbol.

India 

The Indian standardized system of toxicity labels for pesticides uses a 4-color system (red, yellow, blue, green) to plainly label containers with the toxicity class of the contents.

United States

The United States Environmental Protection Agency (EPA) uses four toxicity classes in its toxicity category rating. Classes I to III are required to carry a signal word on the label.  Pesticides are regulated in the United States primarily by the Federal Insecticide, Fungicide, and Rodenticide Act (FIFRA).

Toxicity class I
most toxic;
requires signal word: "Danger-Poison", with skull and crossbones symbol, possibly followed by:
"Fatal if swallowed", "Poisonous if inhaled", "Extremely hazardous by skin contact--rapidly absorbed through skin", or "Corrosive--causes eye damage and severe skin burns"

Class I materials are estimated to be fatal to an adult human at a dose of less than 5 grams (less than a teaspoon).

Toxicity class II
moderately toxic
signal word: "Warning", possibly followed by:
"Harmful or fatal if swallowed", "Harmful or fatal if absorbed through the skin", "Harmful or fatal if inhaled", or "Causes skin and eye irritation"

Class II materials are estimated to be fatal to an adult human at a dose of 5 to 30 grams.

Toxicity class III
slightly toxic
Signal word: Caution, possibly followed by:
"Harmful if swallowed", "May be harmful if absorbed through the skin", "May be harmful if inhaled", or "May irritate eyes, nose, throat, and skin"

Class III materials are estimated to be fatal to an adult human at some dose in excess of 30 grams.

Toxicity class IV
practically nontoxic
no signal word required since 2002

General versus restricted use
Furthermore, the EPA classifies pesticides into those anybody can apply (general use pesticides), and those that must be applied by or under the supervision of a certified individual. Application of restricted use pesticides requires that a record of the application be kept.

See also
Dangerous goods
Hazard symbol
Globally Harmonized System

References

WHO Classification document
Reading the label
Canada toxicity symbols
Protect Yourself
Pesticide ratings
Signal Words Fact Sheet - National Pesticide Information Center

Toxicology
Pesticides